Bielefeldt is a low German surname. 

Notable people with the surname include:

 :de:Alwin Bielefeldt (1857–1942), pioneer of Allotment (gardening)
 Dirk Bielefeldt (born 1957), German actor and cabaret artist
 Heiner Bielefeldt (born 1958), German theologian, philosopher and historian
 Viggo Bielefeldt (1851–1909), Danish composer